Nottoway, or Nottoway Court House, is a census-designated place (CDP) in and the county seat of Nottoway County, Virginia, United States. The population as of the 2010 Census was 84.

Nottoway was originally known as Lewistown.  Nottoway was a stop on the Southside Railroad in the mid-nineteenth Century.   This became the Atlantic, Mississippi and Ohio Railroad in 1870 and then a line in the Norfolk and Western Railway and now the Norfolk Southern Railway.

Since desegregation, the village's public high school now serves the entire county's population.

The Nottoway County Courthouse was listed on the National Register of Historic Places in 1973.

References

Unincorporated communities in Virginia
Census-designated places in Nottoway County, Virginia
County seats in Virginia
Census-designated places in Virginia